A Sting in a Tale is a 2009 Ghanaian thriller film written and directed by Shirley Frimpong-Manso and produced by Ken Attoh. The film won five awards at the Ghana Movie Awards in 2010, including the awards for Best Director, Best Writing — Adapted or Original Screen Play, Best Cinematography and Best Original Song.

Premise
Two unemployed graduates who embark on a journey to make it in a world where you need more than what you have to get what you want.

Cast
Adjetey Anang
Lydia Forson
Majid Michel
Joselyn Dumas

Reviews
It received a 4/5 rating from talkafricanmovies, who recommended the film and concluded that "the movie is a mixed bag of success, death, and ghosts and there is a certain African authenticity about it". It also got favourable review from Ghanacelebrities.

References

External links
 

2009 films
Ghanaian drama films
English-language Ghanaian films
2000s English-language films
2009 thriller films
Best Soundtrack Africa Movie Academy Award winners
Films directed by Shirley Frimpong-Manso